The Midden-Brabant Poort Omloop is a one-day professional cycling race held annually in the Netherlands since 2017. It is part of UCI Europe Tour in category 1.2.

Winners

References

Cycle races in the Netherlands
UCI Europe Tour races
Recurring sporting events established in 2017
Cycling in North Brabant
Sport in Gilze en Rijen